Nirad Narayan Mohapatra (12 November 1947 – 19 February 2015) was an Indian film director. Mohapatra was born in the Indian state of Odisha. He directed the Oriya language film Maya Miriga, television soap operas and documentaries.

Early life
Mohapatra's father a journalist who was against British rule and entered politics after India obtained independence. His mother was a schoolteacher. Nirad was the eldest of 7 children. As a child he visited a cinema near his house in Bhadrak, Odisha. Nirad obtained a B.A degree with distinction in 1967', then enrolled for postgraduate studies in Political Science at Utkal University. He discontinued them in 1968 to start a diploma in film directing at the Film and Television Institute of India in Pune. He completed the diploma in 1971 and worked as a lecturer at the Institute from 1972.

Career
In 1974 he founded Cinexstasy, a film society at Bhubaneswar, Odisha, screening classics of world cinema accompanied by analysis. He ran the society until 1983. He edited the film section of arts journal Mana Phasal, continued to lecture at FTII, wrote for national journals, made documentary films and taught a film appreciation course at Utkal University.

He married Sabita Mohanty in 1978, who, although the marriage was arranged, had attended the film appreciation course and Cinexstasy.

In 1984 Nirad made Maya Miriga, his first feature film, produced on a shoestring budget. It was shot in Puri, a beach-side town in Odisha. The film dealt with family issues, aspirations and break-up. It placed second in that year's Indian Panorama awards for Best National Film and was adjudged the Best Third World Film at International Film Festival Mannheim-Heidelberg, Germany. It received a special jury award at Hawaii International Film Festival, US. It was selected for the 'Critics Week' of Cannes Film Festival (France), BFI London Film Festival, Locarno Film Festival, Los Angeles Film Festival and other International Film Festivals. In 1985, he was invited to visit four US universities to lecture on film.

Mohapatra specialised in documentaries. He was a member of the national film jury and member selection panel for Indian Panorama and a jury member for the 5th International Children's Film Festival, Bhubaneswar. He sat on the governing council of the Film and TV Institute, Pune. He was a member of the NFDC script committee for Odisha. He was twice member of the Academic Council, Satyajit Ray Film and Television Institute, Kolkata. He was the chairman of the Academic Council of the Biju Patnaik Film and Television Institute, Cuttack, Odisha, and member of the Governing Council, SIET, Bhubaneswar. He was a guest lecturer at the Film School of KIIT University, Bhubaneswar.

He died of cardiac arrest on 19 February 2015.

Filmography

References

External links

 http://www.festival-cannes.com/en/archives/ficheFilm/id/1368/year/1984.html[Ref.3]
 BFI.org [Ref.4]
 http://delcinema.it/news/2007-06/locarno_it_giorno_di_bruno_ganz.php[Ref.5]
NY Times – Maya Miriga Overview

1947 births
2015 deaths
Film directors from Odisha
Film and Television Institute of India alumni
Odia film directors
People from Bhadrak
Indian documentary film directors
20th-century Indian film directors
21st-century Indian film directors